Anomotarus is a genus of beetles in the family Carabidae, containing the following species:

 Anomotarus alpinus Baehr, 2005 
 Anomotarus angusticollis (Sloane, 1915) 
 Anomotarus apicalis Baehr, 2003 
 Anomotarus assimilis Baehr, 2005 
 Anomotarus atriceps Baehr, 2005 
 Anomotarus australis (Chaudoir, 1875) 
 Anomotarus bogani Baehr, 2005 
 Anomotarus caerulescens (Blackburn, 1894) 
 Anomotarus chaudoiri (Sloane, 1898) 
 Anomotarus convexiusculus Baehr, 2005 
 Anomotarus cordicollis Baehr, 2005 
 Anomotarus cordifer Baehr, 2005 
 Anomotarus crudelis (Newman, 1840) 
 Anomotarus darlingtoni Baehr, 2003 
 Anomotarus decoratus Andrewes, 1924 
 Anomotarus discofoveatus Moore, 1985 
 Anomotarus elliotti Baehr, 2005 
 Anomotarus fasciatus Baehr, 2005 
 Anomotarus flavocinctus Baehr, 2005 
 Anomotarus flavus Baehr, 2003 
 Anomotarus freyi (Moore, 1967) 
 Anomotarus fulgens Baehr, 2005 
 Anomotarus fuscipes Darlington, 1968 
 Anomotarus geophilus (Montrouzier, 1860) 
 Anomotarus gressitti Darlington, 1968 
 Anomotarus humeralis Sloane, 1917 
 Anomotarus humeratus Baehr, 2003 
 Anomotarus illawarrae (W.J.Macleay, 1873) 
 Anomotarus impictus Baehr, 2003 
 Anomotarus interstitialis (Sloane, 1898) 
 Anomotarus itoi Baehr, 2003 
 Anomotarus jeanneli Mateu, 1972 
 Anomotarus kosciuskoanus Baehr, 2005 
 Anomotarus kununurrae Baehr, 2005 
 Anomotarus lamingtonensis Baehr, 2005 
 Anomotarus lamprus Baehr, 2003 
 Anomotarus laticollis Baehr, 2005 
 Anomotarus latiplaga Baehr, 2003 
 Anomotarus leytensis Baehr, 2003 
 Anomotarus macrops Baehr, 2003 
 Anomotarus maculipennis (Mateu, 1970) 
 Anomotarus magnicollis Baehr, 2003 
 Anomotarus magnus (Moore, 1963) 
 Anomotarus micans Baehr, 2005 
 Anomotarus minor (Blackburn, 1889) 
 Anomotarus minutus Baehr, 2005 
 Anomotarus moluccarum Baehr, 2003 
 Anomotarus monarensis Moore, 1986 
 Anomotarus murrayanus Baehr, 2005 
 Anomotarus mypongae Baehr, 2005 
 Anomotarus nigrinus Baehr, 2005 
 Anomotarus nitidior Baehr, 2005 
 Anomotarus nubilus Baehr, 2005 
 Anomotarus obsoletus Baehr, 2005 
 Anomotarus occidentalis Baehr, 2005 
 Anomotarus ocellatus Darlington, 1968 
 Anomotarus opacus Baehr, 2003 
 Anomotarus ornatellus Baehr, 2003 
 Anomotarus ornatus Louwerens, 1956 
 Anomotarus pakistanus (Jedlicka, 1964) 
 Anomotarus pictulus (Bates, 1873) 
 Anomotarus plagifer Darlington, 1968 
 Anomotarus pseudogressitti Baehr, 2003 
 Anomotarus puncticollis (Sloane, 1917)
 Anomotarus roberi Baehr, 2003 
 Anomotarus rufescens Baehr, 2005 
 Anomotarus ruficornis Sloane, 1917 
 Anomotarus sambiranensis Mateu, 1972 
 Anomotarus semisericeus Baehr, 2003 
 Anomotarus sericus Andrewes, 1929 
 Anomotarus stigmula (Chaudoir, 1852) 
 Anomotarus subterraneus Moore, 1967 
 Anomotarus timorensis Baehr, 2003 
 Anomotarus transversus Darlington, 1968 
 Anomotarus tumidiceps (Blackburn, 1889) 
 Anomotarus umbratus (Blackburn, 1890) 
 Anomotarus undurae Baehr, 2005 
 Anomotarus unicolor Baehr, 1996 
 Anomotarus unimaculatus (Blackburn, 1890) 
 Anomotarus variegatus Moore, 1967 
 Anomotarus vicinus Baehr, 2005 
 Anomotarus violaceipennis Baehr, 2003 
 Anomotarus vittipennis Baehr, 2003 
 Anomotarus wallacei Darlington, 1968 
 Anomotarus wegneri Louwerens, 1962 
 Anomotarus wilcanniae Baehr, 2005 
 Anomotarus wilsoni Baehr, 2005

References

Lebiinae